Reptil is a superhero figure and character appearing in American comic books published by Marvel Comics. He is best known as a supporting member on The Super Hero Squad Show and a member of the Avengers Academy in the comics.

Publication history
A marvel comic Avengers: The Initiative Features Reptil for the first time in the given publication. Anonymously referenced by a previous Wikipedia expert as Reptil #1; created by Christos Gage and Steve Uy.Reptil appeared as a regular character in all 39 issues of Avengers Academy from 2010 to 2013. The character Reptil also appeared in Avengers Arena, a series by Dennis Hopeless and Kev Walker for Marvel NOW!. Reptil's revival of uses in comics revisited his role as a supporting character in the 2021 one-shot King in Black: Spider-Man. Within the same year, Reptil was featured in a 4-issue limited series Reptil, written by Terry Blas and penciled by Enid Balám.

Fictional character biography
Humberto Lopez is a young boy who had registered with the Fifty State Initiative and was living with his grandfather. When S.H.I.E.L.D. scientist Valerie Cooper was putting together a squad to go after Stegron in his plot to reanimate dinosaur fossils, Tigra was placed in charge of the squad and was told to recruit Humberto to help them. Tigra was worried since Humberto had not gone through training yet. When going after Stegron, Humberto explained about his parents and how he got his powers.

His parents, Isaac and Jessica, were palaeontologists who dug up a crystallized bone when he was with them in the desert. The medallion had a strange energy in it that had to do with dinosaurs. Under the codename Reptil, Humberto used it to obtain the abilities of any dinosaur by thinking of it, and even had the empathy to sense dinosaurs and other reptiles.

Upon arrival in Camp Hammond, Reptil went through training for a couple of days. While going through training with different members of the Initiative, Reptil learns the good and bad sides of it. Tigra tells Reptil that being a hero is a responsibility. He tells her that his parents disappeared a year ago on a dig and that he wants to become a hero to find them.

With the help of Baron Von Blitzschlag attaching a device to increase Humbertos's dinosaur empathy, the team locates Stegron. When discovering that he and his dinosaur herd are going to attack a S.H.I.E.L.D. base in South Dakota, Tigra's group intercepts them. However, Stegron took control of Komodo's mind and told her to attack her teammates. Reptil acts hot-headed during the fight and attacks Stegron, but is beaten down. Stegron and his dinosaur herd escape. Reptil suffers a mild concussion and Dr. Cooper tells him that his rash behavior allowed Stegron to escape, and he endangered the lives of his teammates. Tigra speaks to Dr. Cooper in private and asks her to give Humberto one more chance to go out on the field. Valerie tells Tigra that if Reptil messes up, then his career with the Initiative will be over. Tigra speaks to Humberto a few days later and reminds him to stay balanced and not to overcommit. She tells him that everyone has problems and that he is lucky enough to be in a position to learn from other's mistakes and his own.

When Stegron attacked another S.H.I.E.L.D. base in Wyoming, his force of dinosaurs was taken down by a combination of good teamwork and Reptil's abilities. It turns out that Stegron was attacking various S.H.I.E.L.D. bases to locate Moon-Boy (who had been captured from the Savage Land). Stegron was only targeting Moon-Boy so that he could gain control of Devil Dinosaur. Reptil tells Tigra that Moon-Boy is innocent and does not deserve this. Tigra tells him they probably can do something for this, but he has to make a tough choice. She tells the S.H.I.E.L.D. scientists and agents that Moon-Boy was eaten by one of the dinosaurs, and Reptil was sent home because he just got in the way and was completely useless.

In reality, Reptil managed to fly out with Moonboy and take him back to his home to Nevada. Tigra meets Humberto there and they are soon greeted by Ka-Zar and his pet smilodon Zabu. Ka-Zar thanks Tigra and Reptil for bringing Moon-Boy back to him safely and invites Reptil to take Moon-Boy back to the Savage Land. After Moon-Boy is reunited with Devil Dinosaur, Ka-Zar tells Reptil that he will help him find his parents.

Heroic Age
Soon after this as part of the Heroic Age event, Reptil is captured and taken to the US and imprisoned in a government facility. Under the orders of Norman Osborn, experiments are performed on Reptil in an attempt to see if enough stress could turn his whole body into a dinosaur until the word of Norman Osborn's fall. As the agents of the H.A.M.M.E.R. began destroying all the evidence about Norman's clandestine and illegal projects, Reptil manages to escape as the agents were about to murder him. As he escapes the facility, he is approached by Justice and Hank Pym who invite him to become part of the Avengers Academy.

Along with the other students, all of them having been somehow affected by Norman Osborn, Reptil is told that they are the most promising of the heroes Osborn sought out. During their first training session, the students notice the staff arguing about them. By accessing secret computer files, the students realize that, rather than because they showed promise, they have been chosen for the academy because the staff believes they have the greatest potential to go rogue and become supervillains.

During a battle, Mentallo takes control of Reptil's mind and forces him to fly headfirst towards the ground. The threat of imminent death allows Reptil to fully transform into a dinosaur. This saves Reptil's life because Mentallo cannot control the dinosaur's reptilian mind. However, Reptil cannot control himself in this form either. His teachers think that his tendency to repress his troubles instead of dealing with them is the reason for his lack of control. They want him to accept help, but he is reluctant to talk to staff of the academy. Since the best superhuman therapist Doc Samson is gone, they ask Jessica Jones to talk to him. He opens up to her and they talk about many of the things that have been troubling him including his parents, but he keeps his concerns about his fellow students and the academy itself private.

When Korvac returns, Reptil and his fellow studies are placed into future versions of their bodies by Korvac's estranged lover, Carina, to fight him. After Korvac is defeated, Reptil finds himself trapped in his older body. On a day trip to New York, the students run afoul of Arcade, during which Reptil meets Spider-Girl, and they quickly become friends. Spider-Girl attends Academy's "prom night". When she tells him that she liked him the way he was, Reptil then decides to reverts to his teenage body.

After the battle with Korvac he convinces Tigra to allow him and the team to fight Electro. It turns out the entire Sinister Six was with him and they easily defeat the students. Reptil blames himself. He develops great leadership skills and is able to guide the team against Absorbing Man and Titania's attack on the Infinite Mansion during the "Fear Itself" storyline, especially now that since his connection with his future self, he can turn his entire body into a dinosaur without losing control and change his body mass by turning into larger and smaller beasts.

Later, Reptil's brain is switched again with his future self. His future self-attempts to help Hybrid take over the school in order to ensure a future timeline will exist where he and Finesse have a child. superheroes under the age of twenty-one have been made illegal, forcing Reptil and his grandfather Vincente to move in with his Aunt Gloria Quintero and twin cousins Eva and Julian. As they prepare for an upcoming Mexican heritage event, Reptil faces off against a new villain named Megalith who has the answers to what became of his parents. Eva is revealed to be a witch in training, via online courses, while the openly gay Julian creates a new outfit for Reptil to face new threats. It is also implied that Reptil is now in a relationship with Anya Corazon.

Powers and abilities
Reptil wears a crystallized bone medallion that allows him to take on the abilities of different dinosaurs just by thinking about them. He initially cannot fully transform into a complete dinosaur, but can shape-shift various parts of his body into different dinosaur appendages like a tail to strike enemies, changing his arms into pterodactyl wings, or having claws like a Velociraptor. However, after briefly possessing the body of his future self in a fight against Korvac, he retains the ability to fully transform into a full dinosaur. He possesses the strength and ability of whatever dinosaur he is using, and his skin always turns red (lime green in Marvel Super Hero Adventures) and scaly whenever he uses his abilities. He is also capable of healing much faster from deadly injuries when he is in a dinosaur form.

Reptil also has some empathy abilities with dinosaurs. He can sense other reptiles, but he cannot control them or influence their behavior at this time.

His amulet is magical in nature and recently embedded itself into his chest. Not much is known about it except that it is not actually the source of his powers, but only the catalyst that allows him to use them.

In other media

Television
 Reptil appears in The Super Hero Squad Show, voiced by Antony Del Rio. Introduced in the episode "To Err is Superhuman", Captain America brings him onto the Super Hero Squad as its latest member. Throughout season one, Reptil assists the squad in collecting Infinity Fractals before Doctor Doom and his Lethal Legion. In the episode "This Al Dente Earth", the heroes discover Reptil's medallion is an Infinity Fractal that was sent back through time. While he gives it up to rebuild the Infinity Sword, his prolonged exposure to the Fractal grants Reptil the ability to shapeshift into whole dinosaurs.
 Reptil appears in Marvel Super Hero Adventures: Frost Fight!, voiced again by Antony Del Rio. This version is a member of the Avengers Academy who is partnered with the adult Avengers during a "ride-along" program.
 Reptil appears in Marvel Super Hero Adventures, voiced by Jesse Inocalla.
 Reptil appears in Spidey and His Amazing Friends, voiced by Hoku Ramirez.

Video games
 Reptil appears in Marvel Super Hero Squad: The Infinity Gauntlet, voice again by Antony Del Rio.
 Reptil appears as a playable character in Marvel Super Hero Squad Online, voiced again by Antony Del Rio.
 Reptil appears in Marvel Super Hero Squad: Comic Combat, voiced again by Antony Del Rio.
 Reptil appears as a playable character in Lego Marvel's Avengers, voice again by Antony Del Rio.

Collected Editions

References

External links
 Reptil at Marvel Wiki
 Reptil at Comic Vine

Anthropomorphic dinosaurs
Characters created by Christos Gage
Comics characters introduced in 2009
Fictional reptilians
Marvel Comics characters who are shapeshifters
Marvel Comics characters who use magic
Marvel Comics characters with accelerated healing
Marvel Comics characters with superhuman strength
Marvel Comics male superheroes
Mexican superheroes
Teenage superheroes